Ryan McCord (born 21 March 1989) is a Scottish footballer who plays as a midfielder for Brechin. He began his career with Dundee United,  making only two first team appearances, and played for Stirling Albion and Airdrie United on loan before joining Alloa Athletic in 2011, and then Raith Rovers in 2015. He joined Arbroath in 2016 where he remained until the summer of 2019.

He is a former Scotland under-19 international.

Club career
McCord was born in Dundee and joined Dundee United as an under-16 player. He first signed a professional contract with his hometown club in April 2006, having previously played with United team-mate David Goodwillie in the Scottish Youth FA team when he was younger, and was part of the United under-16 team that won the Aberdeen International Football Festival in 2005.

After featuring in United's under-17 squad, McCord and nine other players were given professional contracts in April 2006, and he turned out regularly for United's youth, under-19 and reserve teams over the next two years. By the end of the 2007–08 season, McCord had appeared in the first team squad as an unused substitute on three occasions, and in May was given a one-year contract extension. McCord got his first taste of first team action in July 2008 when he featured as a substitute in two pre-season friendlies, including the glamour friendly match against Barcelona at Tannadice. He made his senior debut in a Scottish League Cup match against Airdrie United in September 2008, appearing as a substitute.

In the January transfer window of 2009, McCord was loaned to Scottish Second Division side Stirling Albion for a month, scoring in his second match for the club. After featuring throughout January, McCord's loan was extended until early March. After returning to United, McCord agreed a contract extension until May 2012, making his second appearance in another League Cup match.

On 13 June 2011 he, and his younger brother Ross, signed a one-year contract with Alloa Athletic. On 3 June 2015 McCord signed a 1-year contract with Raith Rovers. After just one season with the Rovers, McCord moved to Scottish League Two side Arbroath. McCord helped Arbroath win promotion to Scottish League One in 2017. In May 2018 the club stated that McCord would leave, but later in the close season he reversed this decision.

McCord signed for Brechin City on 9 June 2019.

International career
McCord made his Scotland under-19 debut in October 2007, playing in a 1–0 defeat against Ukraine, appearing alongside United team-mate Gordon Pope.

Career statistics

Honours
Alloa Athletic
Scottish Third Division: 2011–12
Scottish First Division play-offs : 2012–13
Scottish Championship play-offs 2014–15

Arbroath
 Scottish League Two : 2016–17
 Scottish League One : 2018-19

References

External links
 
 
Ryan McCord at Soccerway

1989 births
Living people
Footballers from Dundee
Scottish footballers
Scotland youth international footballers
Association football midfielders
Dundee United F.C. players
Stirling Albion F.C. players
Alloa Athletic F.C. players
Airdrieonians F.C. players
Raith Rovers F.C. players
Arbroath F.C. players
Brechin City F.C. players
Scottish Football League players
Scottish Professional Football League players